Nudes-A-Poppin' was an annual pageant in the United States for nude women and men competing in erotic dance. It was the best-known nude event in Indiana, and was held annually from 1975 until 2019.

History
 
The Nudes-A-Poppin' pageant was organized by and held at Ponderosa Sun Club, a family nudist resort founded in 1964 and situated in Roselawn, Indiana. The event was first held in 1975 to attract interest in the resort and was subsequently held annually until 2019. Its "Miss Nude Galaxy" beauty contest dated back to the mid-70s. Nudes-A-Poppin' served as a fund-raiser for the resort and contributed significantly to the local economy. The resort was closed to its members during the pageant, and the one-day event tickets could only be purchased separately. The attendance fee for the event was $50 in 2005 but had risen to $60 by 2016. Up to 2003, there was one event in July and another in August, but, starting in 2004, Nudes-A-Poppin' was reduced to one weekend in July. The 2019 event was the last to be held, with the 2020 and 2021 events being cancelled as a result of the COVID-19 pandemic.

Events

Events held at Nudes-A-Poppin' included the amateur wet T-shirt contest, the sexiest pole dance competition, naked oil wrestling, and others. A "Miss Nude" contest judged by the audience was held here. Various trophies were awarded to the nude contestants, with titles such as "Miss Nude Galaxy", "Miss Nude Go-Go", "Miss Nude Up & Comer", "Miss Nude Rising Star", "Miss Nude Showstopper", "Miss Nude North American" and "Nude Couples Dance Contest".

Lou Harry, writing for Indianapolis Monthly, noted that the participants were prohibited from having sexual contact with another person attending the event or from performing explicitly. Most of the contestants were women. The spectators performed as judges and consisted mostly of men. Photography was a popular activity at the pageant. Spectators were allowed to take photographs but the use of video cameras required a permit.

Attendees
The Ponderosa Sun Club is a family naturist resort and most of its members did not attend the festival. The members agreed to the club hosting Nudes-A-Poppin' because it subsidized their membership fees. Instead local porn stars, strippers, and nudists participate in the event, attracting thousands of other spectators. By 2017 the anticipated number of attendees was around 6000, with the event drawing an international audience. The official website of the event stated that "no clothes are tolerated at the pool." Former porn star Ron Jeremy acted as emcee for Nudes-A-Poppin' for over three decades and personalities such as Home Improvement star Tim Allen, The Munsters star Al Lewis, and John Wayne Bobbitt also hosted the event.

Reviews
In a list titled "Top 10: Sex Festivals" compiled by AskMen.com, Nudes-A-Poppin' was ranked at number four. 

Roselawn, Indiana was placed 1st in the "10 Kinkiest Cities" list compiled by AlterNet.org because of this pageant, along with a high frequency of other adult festivals, adult clubs, and sexual activities such as erotic dancing, public sex, and exhibitionism. 

Ponderosa Sun Club promoted Nudes-A-Poppin' as "The World's Largest Outdoor Nude Beauty Pageant".

See also
Eroticism
Exhibitionism
King and Queen of Fantasy Fest
Folsom Street Fair
Miss Exotic World Pageant
Voyeurism

References

External links
 

Erotic events
Clothing-free events
Indiana culture
Beauty pageants in the United States
History of women in Indiana